Debi Derryberry is an American voice actress who has provided voices for a number of animations and video games. She is best known as the voice of Jimmy Neutron in the film Jimmy Neutron: Boy Genius and the television series The Adventures of Jimmy Neutron, Boy Genius

Biography
Derryberry was born in Indio, California to a family of Hungarian Jewish descent. Her grandparents were Holocaust survivors.  She attended  Indio High School and the University of California, Los Angeles, where she majored in kinesiology.

Her first role was as Skeeter in Hey Vern, It's Ernest! along with Jim Varney in 1988.

Her voice roles include the title character from the first CGI film Jimmy Neutron: Boy Genius and its CGI TV series The Adventures of Jimmy Neutron, Boy Genius, Nergal Jr. from The Grim Adventures of Billy & Mandy, Jay Jay, Herky, Savannah, and Revvin' Evan from Jay Jay the Jet Plane (Following the death of Mary Kay Bergman), Tad on various LeapFrog animated videos and DVD's from 2003 to 2005, Coco Bandicoot in the Crash Bandicoot series, Wednesday in The Addams Family cartoon, Jackie in Bobby's World, Draculaura in Monster High, and Maureen Murphy in F is for Family.

She is the voice of Clay in the Playhouse Disney segments presented in the early 2000s. In English language dubs of anime, she provided the voice of Ryo-Ohki in the Tenchi Muyo series. She received a Best Actress in a Comedy award at the American Anime Awards for her work as Zatch in Zatch Bell! and for Chica's Magic Rainbow in FNAF World Update 2.

Aside from her work as a voice actress, she worked on the 1993 film Free Willy as the stunt double for Jesse in some shots that showed Keiko who played Willy. Derryberry has provided the voices of a series of characters, mostly those of young boys and tomboyish girls. In addition, Derryberry has also provided voice-over for Ice Age: The Meltdown, as the voice of Wednesday Addams in the 1990s animated version of The Addams Family, Weenie and Catrina on Oswald, Taz's little brother Jake on Taz-Mania, Coco Bandicoot in the Crash Bandicoot video game series, and Clay in some Playhouse Disney segments.

She has also done voice work for comedic English language adaptations of anime titles such as Zatch Bell! in which she plays the titular character, his evil twin Zeno, Ryo-Ohki, Yugi, and various other characters from several versions of the anime series Tenchi Muyo!. She also played as the voice of Playhouse Disney's mascot, Clay. Derryberry was the founder and lead singer for the indie country band Honey Pig, writing and producing most of the songs on their two CDs. Currently, she is focusing on a children's music career with her CDs "What a Way to Play" and "Very Derryberry", having won a number of industry awards.

She is an advocate for animals and has hosted at her North Hollywood home a fundraiser for the benefit of orangutans as an endangered species, under the Orang Utan Republik charitable foundation.

She is married to Harvey Jordan and has a son. They live in Toluca Lake, Los Angeles.

Filmography

Animation

Anime

Film

Feature films

Direct-to-video and television films

Video games

Live action

Theme parks

Other roles
 The character Speedy in Alka-Seltzer commercials.
 The character Zack Putterman in Duracell commercials.

References

 Book references

External links

Living people
Actresses from California
People of Hungarian-Jewish descent
American television actresses
American video game actresses
American voice actresses
Date of birth missing (living people)
People from Indio, California
Year of birth missing (living people)
20th-century American actresses
21st-century American actresses